Myiodexia is a genus of parasitic flies in the family Tachinidae. There is one described species in Myiodexia, M. deserticola.

Distribution
Chile.

References

Dexiinae
Diptera of South America
Tachinidae genera